The Men's +105 kilograms event at the 2018 Asian Games took place on 27 August 2018 at the Jakarta International Expo Hall A.

Schedule
All times are Western Indonesia Time (UTC+07:00)

Records

Results
Legend
NM — No mark

References

External links

Weightlifting at the 2018 Asian Games 
Official Result Book Weightlifting at awfederation.com

Men's 105 kg